The Majorettes (released in the United Kingdom as One by One) is a 1986 American slasher film directed by S. William Hinzman, written and produced by John A. Russo, which he adapted from his own novel. Its plot follows a string of serial killings centered on the majorette squad of a small-town high school.

Plot
A camouflage-clad serial killer has begun mysteriously killing the members of the school's majorette squad under the guise of "saving their souls" before they reach adulthood. The local sheriff and a federal agent investigate the killings. Pregnant teenager Nicole Hendricks is among the first victims, who is attacked and murdered alongside Tommy Harvack, a male acquaintance. Her body is found lying on the shore of a creek. Meanwhile, detective Roland Martell is carrying on an affair with teenaged Marie Morgan, a friend of Nicole.

Meanwhile, Vicky McAllister lives with her rich but invalid grandmother and her grandmother's housekeeper, Helga Schuler. Unknown to Vicky, Helga and her son Harry (a pervert who spies on Vicky and her fellow majorette friends in the shower and takes nude photos of them) poisoned her grandmother (rendering her paralyzed, mute, and utterly helpless) and murdered Vicky's parents years earlier. Helga has rewritten the grandmother's will to inherit everything if Vicky and her grandmother die, but a small catch can foil the entire plot: Due to an irrevocable clause in the original will that had to be left intact in the forged revised will, if Vicky dies before her 18th birthday, the grandmother's fortune will go to the state without an adult heir left alive to inherit.

After another majorette, Shirley, is found murdered in her swimming pool, Roland suspects that there is a significance to the fact that the victims are being found in water—he surmises it has a symbolic significance, akin to a baptismal purification ritual. Helga ultimately finds out the identity of the killer, the local Sheriff, when Harry stumbles upon the sheriff killing another victim in the shower; after the victim managed to remove the killer's hood from his face prior to dying. The housekeeper and her son ambush the sheriff at his house, discovering that he is a religious fanatic that is murdering the majorette squad before they turn 18 so that they will stay pure and not become sinful adults who have pre-marital sex or do drugs. They instruct the sheriff that he is to kill Vicky for the pair, but only after she turns 18 so they can steal the entire family fortune.

Vicky is subsequently kidnapped by a local biker gang that seeks to rape and kill her, leading to further confusion among the police and investigators. Her boyfriend, Jeff, accrues a large number of weapons and stages a siege against the bikers' headquarters to save Vicky. In the confusion of Vicky's abduction, the sheriff turns the tables on his blackmailers: He murders Helga and destroys photographic evidence proving him to be the killer. The Sheriff subsequently frames the now-dead Harry (who was killed by the biker gang earlier) for the murders, as he had a history of being a peeping tom.

Some time later, Vicky attends her high school graduation. After the ceremony, she watches from a distance as her coach trains a young group of elementary school girls to be majorettes. Also watching the young girls is the sheriff, who has gotten away with his crimes.

Cast

Production
The Majorettes was filmed between October and November 1985, with principal photography occurring at Cornell High School in the Pittsburgh suburb of Coraopolis, with additional filming at the Fox Chapel Yacht Club. Its production budget was estimated at $85,000. The football coach was played by then head-coach of the Cornell Raiders, Wilbert Roncone (billed as "Wilbur Roncone").

Release
The film was released theatrically in Europe in March 1987 under the title One by One, though as of February 1987, the film had not secured a theatrical distributor in the United States; at the time, Russo and Hinzman were in negotiation for a home video distribution deal with Vestron Video. Vestron released the film on VHS on August 17, 1988.

Critical response
Critic Jim Harper wrote of the film: "About halfway through...  the film stops being a slasher movie and swings into action-thriller territory, with chase sequences explosions and gunfights. Not that it makes the film more interesting. The kills are mostly bloodless and the suspense non-existent. Bill Hinzman (the first zombie in Night of the Living Dead) handles the direction pretty well but the script is pretty dumb."

References

Sources

External links 

 

1986 horror films
1986 films
1980s slasher films
Films based on American novels
American independent films
American slasher films
Cheerleading films
Films set in Pittsburgh
Films shot in Pennsylvania
American serial killer films
Films directed by Bill Hinzman
Vestron Pictures films
1980s American films